Gate 7 is the most popular association of organized fans of Olympiacos CFP.

History 
There is no exact date for the establishment of Θύρα 7. It took its name from the homonymous gate 7 of Karaiskakis Stadium, in Piraeus, from where its hard-core fans watched the Olympiacos games.

Sometime in the early 70's, the then hardliners moved to this port, from gate 13 picked up due to the cheap ticket.

Earlier, "SAFOP" (Association of Athenian Olympiacos Piraeus Fans) was created on Socratous Street and the "Red and White Army" behind Karaiskaki. Even earlier, in 1957, there was the "SFOP" (Association of Fans of Piraeus Olympiacos) with an organized presence on trips to Drama and Thessaloniki, but also to other cities in Greece.

Main members
  First generation 
 Gotzila, Ekodomos, Girapas, Papachimonas, Liofagos, Nero, Hamodrakas, Kondylopoulos, Halas, Timpestia.

  Second generation 
 Voukelatoi, Chroumbes, Ozi, Chocolate, Bekakos, Underwater, Acrobat, Akis, Clone, Poet, Charos, Korakis, Pagratiotis.

Gate 7 today
After the demolition of the Karaiskakis Stadium and the construction of  New Karaiskakis Stadium the association has established its Gate 7. It has a total of 58 sub-links in various parts of the world, in Greece, Cyprus, America, Germany, London and two major Greek communities in Australia, Sydney and Melbourne. The main liaison and headquarters of the organization is "PORTO LEONE" in Keratsini.

See also
Karaiskakis Stadium disaster

References

External links
The chronicle of the incident at the Olympiakos website
Gate 7 fans Website
 Gate7.gr  Photo Tribute
  Newspapers

Football in Greece
Association football hooligan firms
Greek association football supporters' associations
Ultras groups